Ḷḷindes is one of thirteen parishes (administrative divisions) in Quirós, a municipality within the province and autonomous community of the Principality of Asturias, in northern Spain.

The population is 73.

Villages 
 El Corral
 Cortes
 El Toḷḷo
 Fresneo de Cortes
 Ḷḷindes

References 

Parishes in Quirós